The Paraíso Fault or Palmira-Buga Fault is a thrust fault with minor dextral lateral movement in the department of Valle del Cauca in southwestern Colombia.

Etymology 
The fault is named after hacienda El Paraíso. An alternative name is Palmira-Buga Fault.

Description 

The Paraiso Fault is part of the Romeral Fault System in southwestern Colombia. It is located at the western slope of the Central Ranges, east of the city of Palmira. The fault displaces alluvial fans and debris flows on the eastern border of the Valle del Cauca Department. North of the Amaime River, the fault seems to be more active in late Quaternary than the portion south of the river.

Geographic expression suggests that the northern portion is more active than the southern one.

Activity 
The fault is considered active with Holocene tectonic movement. Two trenches were opened in the northern part of the fault: the Venecia and Piedechinche trenches, each of which show Holocene tectonic deformation. Movement is well defined as early Holocene, it is younger than 6,320 yr as determined from C-14 ages of folded paleosoils sampled in the Venecia trench.

See also 

 List of earthquakes in Colombia
 Cauca Fault System

References

Bibliography

Maps

Further reading 
 

Seismic faults of Colombia
Thrust faults
Active faults
Faults
Earthquakes in Colombia